Phyllis Fay Gotlieb (née Bloom; May 25, 1926 July 14, 2009) was a Canadian science fiction novelist and poet.

Biography 

Born of Jewish heritage in Toronto, Gotlieb graduated from the University of Toronto with degrees in literature in 1948 (BA) and 1950 (MA).

In 1961, Gotlieb published the pamphlet Who Knows One, a collection of poems. Her first novel, the science-fiction tale Sunburst, was published in 1964.  Gotlieb won the Prix Aurora Award for Best Novel in 1982 for her novel A Judgement of Dragons. The Sunburst Award is named for her first novel. 

Her husband was Calvin Gotlieb (1921–2016), a computer-science professor; they lived in Toronto, Ontario.

Bibliography

Science fiction books
Sunburst. New York: Fawcett, 1964.
Why Should I Have All the Grief? Toronto: Macmillan, 1969.
O Master Caliban! New York: Harper and Row, 1976.
A Judgement of Dragons. New York: Berkley Publishers, 1980.
Emperor, Swords, Pentacles. New York: Ace, 1982.
Son of the Morning and Other Stories. New York: Ace, 1983.
The Kingdom of the Cats. New York: Ace, 1985.
Heart of Red Iron. New York: St. Martin's Press, 1989.
Blue Apes. Edmonton: Tesseract Books, 1995.
Flesh and Gold. New York: Tor, 1998.
Violent Stars. New York: Tor, 1999.
Mindworld. New York: Tor, 2002.
Birthstones. Toronto: Robert J. Sawyer Books, 2007.

Poetry collections
Who Knows One? Toronto: Hawkshead Press, 1961.
Within the Zodiac. Toronto: McClelland & Stewart, 1964.
Ordinary Moving. Toronto: Oxford University Press, 1969.
Doctor Umlaut's Earthly Kingdom. London, ON: Calliope Press, 1974.
The Works. London, ON: Calliope Press, 1978.
Red Blood Black Ink White Paper: New and Selected Poems 1961–2001. Toronto: Exile Editions, 2002. – 2002
Phyllis Loves Kelly. Toronto: University of Toronto, 2014.

Notes

References

External links
Obituary by Cory Doctorow

Selected poetry of Phyllis Gotlieb – Biography & 15 poems (Aquarius, as I was walking down the street, A Catful of Buttermilk, Death's Head, A Discourse, A Double Vision, First Person Demonstrative, Hospitality, Latitude, Ordinary, Moving, Red Black White, Seventh Seal, So Long It's Been, Thirty-Six Ways of Looking at Toronto Ontario, What I Know (Making Free with Villon's Smalltalk))
 Archives of Phyllis Gotlieb (Phyllis Fay Gotlieb fonds, R4738) are held at Library and Archives Canada

1926 births
2009 deaths
20th-century Canadian poets
20th-century Canadian novelists
Canadian science fiction writers
Canadian women novelists
Canadian women poets
Jewish Canadian writers
Jewish poets
Jewish women writers
University of Toronto alumni
Women science fiction and fantasy writers
Writers from Toronto
20th-century Canadian women writers